Lausche is the highest peak of the Lusatian Mountains and the highest mountain in the German part of the Upper Lusatia region at . The conical mountain is part of the Zittau Mountains range, situated on the border of the German state of Saxony with the Liberec Region of the Czech Republic.

Mountains of Saxony
Mountain peaks of the Sudetes